Rabdophaga saliciperda is a species of gall midges which forms galls on willows (Salix species). It was first described by Léon Jean Marie Dufour in 1841.

Description
The woody, irregular swellings are on the twigs of willows with the larval chambers just below the bark. Larvae are in individual chambers and are described as yellowish-orange, or greenish yellow to white or reddish depending on the authority. Larvae prepare emergence windows before pupating. Galls have been recorded on Salix alba, S. aurita, S. aurita x cinerea, S. cinerea subsp. oleifolia, S. caprea , Salix × fragilis and S. repens.

Distribution
Has been recorded from Europe, Japan and Russia.

Inquilines
The inquiline Lestodiplosis gammae has also been found in this gall and the gall  of R. salicis.

References

saliciperda
Diptera of Asia
Nematoceran flies of Europe
Gall-inducing insects
Insects described in 1841
Taxa named by Léon Jean Marie Dufour
Willow galls